Beinn Mhòr is a mountain on the island of South Uist in the Outer Hebrides of Scotland. The name Beinn Mhòr is Gaelic for "big mountain". The correct name for the mountain in Gaelic is Gèideabhal.

References

Marilyns of Scotland
Grahams
Mountains and hills of the Outer Hebrides
South Uist